The AACTA Award for Best Actor in a Leading Role is an award presented by the Australian Academy of Cinema and Television Arts (AACTA), a non-profit organisation whose aim is to "identify, award, promote and celebrate Australia's greatest achievements in film and television." The award is presented at the annual AACTA Awards, which hand out accolades for achievements in feature film, television, documentaries and short films. From 1971 to 2010, the category was presented by the Australian Film Institute (AFI), the Academy's parent organisation, at the annual Australian Film Institute Awards (known as the AFI Awards). When the AFI launched the Academy in 2011, it changed the annual ceremony to the AACTA Awards, with the current award being a continuation of the AFI Award for Best Actor in a Leading Role.

From 1971 up until 1975, the awards for Best Actor and Best Actress were awarded in a single category for Best Performance. In 1971 the prize was given to Monica Maughan over fellow nominee Peter Cummins, who received a special mention for his performances in the films Some Regrets, The Hot Centre of the World (1971 short film), Bonjour Balwyn and Carson's Watermelons. From 1972 to 1975, the single award was handed out to the best actor and actress of the respective award giving years, with honourable mentions made to supporting casts. From 1976 to the present, the accolade has been handed out as a separate award for Best Actor in a Leading Role.

Candidates for this award must be human and male, and cannot be nominated for the same role in the supporting actor category.

Winners & nominations

References

External links
Afi.org.au — AFI Award Winners 
AACTA Winners & Nominees

AACTA Awards
AACTA Award winners
Film awards for lead actor